The Pacific EP is the debut extended play by indie rock band Holy Holy, released on 28 March 2014 by Wonderlick Entertainment and distributed by Sony Music Australia.

Release
The Pacific EP was released on CD, digital download and streaming on 28 March 2014. The EP was released by Wonderlick Entertainment, with distribution by Sony Music Australia.

Singles
The Pacific EP was preceded by three singles.

"Impossible Like You" was released in July 2013 as the EP's lead single.

"House of Cards" was released on 28 February 2014 as the EP's second single. 

"Impossible Like You" was re-released on 21 March 2014 as the EP's third and final single.

Critical reception

Labelling the release "pure quality", Liz Elleson of The Brag said: "The songwriting is simple but nostalgic and anthemic, and the EP as a whole is densely musical and texturally fascinating."

Ally Cole of AAA Backstage said: "The Pacific EP is a release full of crescendos. With lyrics covering themes of humanity in the unknown, mortality and divinity, the four songs drive home narratives with building soundtracks of duelling guitars, harmony-riddled vocals and commanding percussion." Cole continued, saying: "the strength of Holy Holy can simply be put down to a sheer dedication to craft. Their songs have a timeless quality, fusing impeccable songwriting, thought-provoking lyrics, near-flawless performances, and lush production."

Oliver Friend of Forte Magazine believed the EP would make many "indie festival fans very happy and excited" and labelled "House of Cards" the standout track.

Alexander Crowden from Beat Magazine said the EP sounded "something like all of the best indie-rock songs of the past two years combined into four tracks", before concluding the review by saying  "[The Pacific EP] is a creative and enjoyable first step".

Gemma Bastiani of The AU Review wrote "The Pacific makes its way into your head and swirls around until you are well and truly satisfied with your choice to listen." She added that the band had "manage[d] to pull off one of the hardest things in modern music: drawing clear inspiration from matured acts, while still sounding completely fresh and new."

Track listing

Personnel
Adapted from the EP's liner notes.

Musicians
Holy Holy
 Timothy Carroll – writing, vocals, guitar  
 Oscar Dawson – writing, guitar, keyboards , bass 
 Ryan Strathie – writing , drums 
 Matt Redlich – keyboard 

Other musicians
 Hannah Macklin – backing vocals 
 Joe Franklin – bass 
 Myka Wallace – drums

Technical
 William Bowden – mastering 
 Matt Redlich – mixing, production

Artwork
 Charles Hillhouse – cover
 Phoebe Jojo Dann – design

References

External links
 

2014 debut EPs
Holy Holy (Australian band) EPs
Albums produced by Matt Redlich
Sony Music Australia EPs
Wonderlick Entertainment EPs